Crispin "Pen" Parungao Medina Sr. (born August 27, 1950, in Arayat, Pampanga) is an actor from the Philippines who started acting in theater plays in his youth. He eventually played versatile roles on the big screen and in various television shows. He became well-known after getting the role of the villainous Hagorn in the 2005 fantasy television series Encantadia. He has won the Nora Aunor Ulirang Artista Lifetime Achievement Award during the 33rd PMPC Star Awards for Movies, the Best Supporting Actor Award at the 62nd FAMAS Awards, and the Best Actor Award at the 6th Cinema One Originals Film Festival.

He is also the second KFC Filipino Colonel as well as a model and painter. He is also an activist who joins rallies against those in power as well as participates in anti-vaccination and anti-mask protests amidst the COVID-19 pandemic.

Personal life

Pen Medina was born to Eliseo Lapuz Medina Sr. and Trinidad Guinto Parungao in Arayat, Pampanga on August 27, 1950. He graduated high school at Arayat Institute of Pampanga and went to different schools in colleges, which include the University of Santo Tomas, Far Eastern University, and the University of the East. He usually took up fine arts, premed, and other courses with a bachelor of arts degree but he later dropped out and pursued an acting career.

He is married to Victoria Aquino Chupungco and he is the father of Karl Medina, Crispin "Ping" Medina II, Alex Vincent Medina, Japs Medina, Victor Medina, Zeth Medina and JL Medina. His sons Ping and Alex, whom both had their roots in indie films, are active on local television. His other sons Karl and Victor have followed suit by taking on acting roles in other indie films as well. Pen also has a son with actress Tess Antonio.

Health
In July 2022, his family announced that he has a degenerative disc disease and has been bedridden in a hospital for several weeks. He has undergone spinal surgery to treat the disease.

Career

Theater

Pen started as a theater actor and appeared in productions by Teatro Kabataan such as Ang Paglilitis ni Mang Serapio (The Trial of Old Serapio, 1977) and Nang Pista sa Aming Bayan (During Our Town's Feast, 1978). He portrayed various characters in the Cultural Center of the Philippines plays, which include Andres Bonifacio (1980) as Emilio Jacinto, Kanser (Cancer) in 1981 as Kapitan Tiago, and appeared again in 1993 as Elias, Gregorio Aglipay (1982) as Fr. Brillantes, Makinig Kayong Mabuti (Listen Carefully, 1986) as Gen. Henry Baltazar, and Ginuntuang Bayan (Shūsaku Endō's Golden Country, 1990) as Fr. Ferreira. He also appeared in stage plays at the University of the Philippines such as Patay Na si Sizwe Banzi (Athol Fugard's Sizwe Banzi Is Dead, 1986) as Styles, Tatalon (1987) as the Jeepney Driver; and Supremo (Supreme Chief, 1991) as Andres Bonifacio.

He also acted in the Metropolitan Theater appearing in plays such as Gironiere (1985) as Alila, and El Filibusterismo (Subversion, 1991, an adaptation of Jose Rizal's second novel) as Simoun. He also portrayed Rizal/Crisostomo Ibarra in Noli Me Tangere (Touch Me Not, 1986, an adaptation of Rizal's first novel) at Puerta Real. Other theaters that he performed for include Teatro Pilipino, Tanghalang Pilipino, and Bulwagang Gantimpala as well as for independent theater groups or on campus.

Film
It was in the early 1980s when Pen crossed over to films. In 1982, he starred in his first film, Himala, which was headlined by Nora Aunor. He subsequently appeared in other Filipino films in the 1980s such as Karnal (Of the Flesh, 1983), Sister Stella L. (1984), Scorpio Nights (1985), Virgin Forest (1985), and Unfaithful Wife (1986). He also has several acting credits in foreign films, most notably, the 1988 Australian television film Dangerous Life, where he plays Col. Eduardo Doromal, a fictionalized character based on a historical figure during the People Power Revolution.

In the 1990s, Pen continued his film career starring in historical films and films with social relevance. He starred in the 1993 film Sakay as Lucio de Vega, a historical figure who, together with Macario Sakay, were revolutionaries fighting the Americans, and were later outlawed and hanged in 1907. In the 1998 film José Rizal, he played Paciano Mercado, the older brother of Jose Rizal. He also played Jose Rizal in the documentary film entitled Jose Rizal: Ang Buhay ng Isang Bayani (Jose Rizal: A Hero’s Life, 1996), which was produced by Ateneo de Manila University. The other films in the 1990s that Pen starred in include Mumbaki (Shaman, 1996), Ligaya ang Itawag Mo sa Akin (They Call Me Joy, 1997), and Sa Pusod ng Dagat (In the Navel of the Sea, 1998).

In the Marilou Diaz-Abaya film Muro Ami (1999), Pen got his first acting award as he won Best Supporting Actor given during the 25th Metro Manila Film Festival. The film tells a story about a cruel captain named Fredo (Cesar Montano's character) who employs children for his illegal fishing business. Pen played Dado, the father of Fredo. After a year, he became one of the cast of the Joel Lamangan film Deathrow playing a booty bandit inmate named Gabino. His role earned him another Best Supporting Actor award given by the Film Academy of the Philippines in 2001. He starred as an ex-convict in another prison-themed film, Layang Bilanggo (2010), in which he garnered a Best Actor award from the 6th Cinema One Originals Film Festival.

In the 2012 film Kamera Obskura, Pen got to play the main role of Juan, a character from a lost silent film. Pen also co-wrote the script of the film.

Television
After starring in stage plays and films, Pen entered television and appeared in the political satire television show Sic O'Clock News in the late 1980s. He continued to guest in other television programs, which include Goin' Bananas, and Batibot. He is also part of the cast of the television series Villa Quintana, Tabing Ilog, and Sa Puso Ko Iingatan Ka. In 2005, he starred in the fantasy series Encantadia as the main villain Hagorn, which is his most well-known television role. His other television acting credits include Joaquin Bordado, E-Boy, Be Careful With My Heart, and Aso ni San Roque.

Activism
Pen is also known as an activist who joined rallies including calling for then Philippine President Gloria Macapagal-Arroyo's resignation, protesting against the burial of former Philippine President Ferdinand Marcos, and protesting against the meddling of foreign governments, particularly the United States and China, over Philippine affairs. He also attended a rally against then-Philippine President Rodrigo Duterte and urged protesters to love and enlighten supporters of the Duterte administration. Amid the COVID-19 pandemic in the Philippines, he also joined anti-vaccination and anti-mask protests saying that the COVID-19 virus "can go through any mask" and challenged critics, particularly television personality Kiko Rustia, to a debate. Rustia declined the debate because he is not a doctor and he "support(s) vaccines and the science behind it."

Filmography

Television

Film

Awards

References

External links
 

1950 births
Living people
Filipino male comedians
Filipino activists
Kapampangan people
People from Pampanga
Male actors from Pampanga
Filipino male film actors
Filipino male television actors
GMA Network personalities
ABS-CBN personalities
TV5 (Philippine TV network) personalities